K52 or K-52 may refer to:

 K-52 (Kansas highway)
 K-52 trailer, an American military trailer
 , a sloop of the Royal Navy
 Monroe City Regional Airport, in Monroe County, Missouri
 Potassium-52, an isotope of potassium
 Shin-Fuji Station (Hokkaido)